Rouyn-Noranda–Témiscamingue is a provincial electoral district in the Abitibi-Témiscamingue region of Quebec, Canada, which elects members to the National Assembly of Quebec. It notably includes large portions of the city of Rouyn-Noranda as well as the cities or municipalities of Ville-Marie, Témiscaming, Lorrainville, Saint-Bruno-de-Guigues, Notre-Dame-du-Nord and Laverlochère-Angliers. No incumbent since Rémy Trudel (who won re-election in 1998) has won re-election in the riding.

It was created for the 1981 election from parts of Rouyn-Noranda, Gatineau and Pontiac-Témiscamingue electoral districts.

In the change from the 2001 to the 2011 electoral map, its territory was unchanged.

Members of the National Assembly

* These are two different people with the same name

Election results

|}

^ Change is from redistributed results. CAQ change is from ADQ.

|-
 
|Liberal
|Daniel Bernard
|align="right"|10,358
|align="right"|42.30
|align="right"| +9.64

|-
|}

|-
 
|Liberal
|Daniel Bernard
|align="right"|9,352
|align="right"|32.66
|align="right"|

|-
|}

References

External links
Information
 Elections Quebec

Election results
 Election results (National Assembly)

Maps
 2011 map (PDF)
 2001 map (Flash)
2001–2011 changes (Flash)
1992–2001 changes (Flash)
 Electoral map of Abitibi-Témiscamingue region
 Quebec electoral map, 2011 

Quebec provincial electoral districts
Rouyn-Noranda